The Nuclear Threat Initiative, generally referred to as NTI, is a non-profit organization located in Washington, D.C. The American foreign policy think tank was founded in 2001 by former U.S. Senator Sam Nunn and describes itself as a "nonprofit, nonpartisan global security organization focused on reducing nuclear and biological threats imperiling humanity."

NTI has four policy programs: the Global Nuclear Policy Program, Nuclear Materials Security, Scientific and Technical Affairs, and Global Biological Policy and Programs (stylized as NTI | bio).

Mission
NTI's self-described mission is "to transform global security by driving systemic solutions to nuclear and biological threats imperiling humanity."

History
NTI was founded in 2001 by former U.S. Senator Sam Nunn and philanthropist Ted Turner. The launch event was held at the National Press Club on January 8, 2001. An event celebrating NTI’s 20th anniversary was held on April 12, 2022, with a one-year delay due to the COVID-19 pandemic.

Work

Low-Enriched Uranium Bank 
NTI supported the development of an international low-enriched uranium bank to help prevent the proliferation of nuclear technology. NTI advisor Warren Buffett provided $50 million to jump-start the reserve, which is owned and managed by the International Atomic Energy Agency and located in Kazakhstan. The bank became fully operational in October 2019 after receiving its first shipment of uranium.

Highly Enriched Uranium Elimination

Serbia 
In 2002, NTI helped remove 100 pounds of highly-enriched uranium from a nuclear reactor in modern-day Serbia.

Kazakhstan 
NTI provided technical and financial support to help convert 2,900 kilograms of highly-enriched uranium to low-enriched uranium in Kazakhstan in 2005. The organization committed $1.3 million for reactor safety systems.

Nuclear Security Index 
NTI has produced a biennial "Nuclear Security Index" in partnership with Economist Impact since 2012. The "NTI Index" benchmarks nuclear security conditions across 176 countries.

As part of the Index, NTI also develops and releases a Radioactive Source Security Assessment that includes recommendations on securing and eliminating radiological sources used and stored at thousands of sites across more than 100 countries.

Global Health Security Index 
The Global Health Security Index, produced by NTI, the Johns Hopkins Center for Health Security, and Economist Impact, is a biennial index that assesses countries' preparedness to respond to pandemics and epidemics. The GHS Index assesses 195 countries' abilities to prevent, detect, and respond to health emergencies based on publicly available information.

World Health Organization–Nuclear Threat Initiative Emergency Outbreak Response Fund 
In 2002, NTI partnered with the World Health Organization (WHO) to create a $500,000 rapid response fund for infectious disease outbreaks.

Global Dialogue on Nuclear Security Priorities 
NTI regularly convenes meetings among global nuclear security experts and government officials to discuss issues related to nuclear security. Global Dialogue summits have taken place in France, the Netherlands, the Czech Republic, Germany, Austria, the United Kingdom, the United States, and Japan.

Establishment of New Organizations 
In 2003, NTI created the Middle East Consortium for Infectious Disease Surveillance (MECIDS) with participation from Israel, Jordan, and the Palestinian Authority. MECIDS shares official health data and conducts infectious disease prevention training.

In 2008, NTI helped create the World Institute for Nuclear Security (WINS), in Vienna, as part of its focus to secure nuclear materials worldwide.

NTI also created Connecting Organizations for Disease Surveillance (CORDS), which launched in 2013 as an independent NGO that links international disease surveillance networks, supported by the World Health Organization and Food and Agriculture Organization of the United Nations.

Films 
The organization produced the 2005 film, Last Best Chance, a docudrama about nuclear terrorism that aired on HBO. NTI also produced the 2010 documentary film Nuclear Tipping Point, which was screened by President Obama at the White House in April 2010 and featured on The Colbert Report.

Leadership

Ernest J. Moniz has served as chief executive officer since June 2017, and Joan Rohlfing serves as president and chief operating officer. Co-chaired by Moniz, Nunn, and Ted Turner, NTI is governed by a Board of Directors with both current and emeritus members from around the globe.

Board of Directors 

 Ernest J. Moniz, Co-Chairman and Chief Executive Officer, NTI
 Sam Nunn, Co-Chair, Co-Founder and Strategic Advisor, NTI
 Ted Turner, Co-Chair
 Des Browne, Vice Chairman, NTI
 Joan Rohlfing, President, NTI
 Ambassador Hamad Alkaabi, Permanent Representative of the United Arab Emirates to the International Atomic Energy Agency and Special Representative for International Nuclear Cooperation
 Ambassador Brooke D. Anderson, President of Pivotal Ventures
 Dr. Alexey Arbatov, Head, Center for International Security at Institute of World Economy and International Relations, Russian Academy of Sciences
 Edmund G. Brown Jr., Former Governor of California
 Ambassador Rolf Ekeus, Chairman Emeritus of the Board, Stockholm International Peace Research Institute
 Gideon Frank, Former Director General of the Israel Atomic Energy Commission
 Margaret A. Hamburg, M.D., Former Commissioner of the U.S. Food and Drug Administration
 Ambassador Jon M. Huntsman, Jr., Former U.S. Ambassador to Russia, China, and Singapore
 Igor S. Ivanov, Former Minister of Foreign Affairs, Russia
 Riaz Mohammad Khan, Former Foreign Secretary of Pakistan
 Jeong H. Kim, Former President, Bell Labs
 Michelle McMurry-Heath, President and CEO, Biotechnology Innovation Organization
 Admiral Michael G. Mullen, USN (ret.), 17th Chairman, Joint Chiefs of Staff
 Ronald L. Olson, Partner, Los Angeles office of Munger, Tolles & Olson
 Michael A. Peterson, Chairman and Chief Executive Officer of the Peter G. Peterson Foundation
 Malcolm Rifkind, Former Foreign Secretary, UK
 Ray Rothrock, Executive Chairman, RedSeal, Inc. and Partner Emeritus, Venrock
 Louis Salkind, President, Bright Horizon Foundation
 Laura Turner Seydel, Chair of Captain Planet Foundation and Director of Turner Foundation
 Dr. Nathalie Tocci, Director, Istituto Affari Internazionali
 Ambassador Alexa Wesner, Former U.S. Ambassador to Austria
 Dr. Peng Yuan, President, China Institutes of Contemporary International Relations

Advisors to the Board of Directors 

 Warren Buffett, CEO of Berkshire Hathaway Inc.
 Siegfried S. Hecker, Co-director, Stanford University Center for International Security and Cooperation

Emeritus Board 

 Charles A. Bowsher, Former Comptroller General to the United States and Head of the General Accounting Office
 Liru Cui, Former President of China Institutes of Contemporary International Relations
 Charles B. Curtis, President Emeritus of NTI
 Susan Eisenhower
 HRH Prince El Hassan bin Talal of Jordan
 Pierre Lellouche
 Jessica T. Mathews
 Ambassador Hisashi Owada
 William J. Perry
 Nafis Sadik
 Amartya Sen
 Fujia Yang

Financials 
NTI receives funding from a number of sources, including foundations, individuals, non-U.S. governments, and corporations. Funders and financial information are listed in NTI’s annual report, which is published online each year. The organization does not accept U.S. government funding.

References

External links
 
 Global Health Security Index
 Nuclear Security Index
 JSTOR Nuclear Threat Initiative, Research Reports

2001 establishments in Washington, D.C.
Anti–nuclear weapons movement
Foreign policy and strategy think tanks in the United States
Nuclear proliferation
Nuclear safety in the United States
Organizations established in 2001
Think tanks based in Washington, D.C.
Think tanks established in 2001
Existential risk organizations
Organizations associated with effective altruism